Hyphoporus pugnator, is a species of predaceous diving beetle found in India and Sri Lanka. The species is sometimes placed in the genus Hygrotus by some authors.

References 

Dytiscidae
Insects of Sri Lanka
Insects described in 1890